Juan Sebastián "Sebas" Saiz Soto (born 15 July 1994) is a Spanish basketball player for Alvark Tokyo of the B.League. He also holds Dominican citizenship.

Early years
Saiz, whose father is Spanish and his mother is from Dominican Republic, started playing basketball at the youth teams of Real Madrid, until transferring to CB Talavera due to personal reasons. In 2009, he passed the trials to join Estudiantes, where he made his debut in senior competitions, playing in some Liga EBA games in 2011, at age 16.

High school and college career
Saiz moved in 2012 to the United States to continue his basketball career, and in 2013 he joined the Ole Miss Rebels, averaging 5.1 points and 5.6 rebounds per game in his first season. He ended his college years becoming only the second player in school history after Murphy Holloway to surpass 1,000 points and 900 rebounds and was included in the All-Conference first team of the Southeastern Conference.

Professional career
In July 2017, Saiz signed his first professional contract with Real Madrid, terminating previously with Estudiantes. One month later, he was loaned to San Pablo Burgos, debutant in the Spanish Liga ACB, where he averaged 9.1 points and 4.9 rebounds per game.

In July 2018, he was loaned to Iberostar Tenerife of the Liga ACB. He will make his debut in European competition as the Canarian team is qualified for the Basketball Champions League.

On August 1, 2019, Saiz signed with Sun Rockers Shibuya of the B.League. He signed with Chiba Jets on June 3, 2020.

International career
Saiz played with the Spanish youth teams, taking part of the under-19 team that finished in the fifth position at the 2013 World Championship.

With the under-20 team the European Championship, achieving a bronze medal in 2013 and a silver one in 2014.

He made his debut with Spain in November 2017, at the 2019 World Cup qualifying match played in Podgorica against Montenegro.

References

External links
 ACB profile 
 FIBA profile
 RealGM profile
 Ole Miss Rebels bio

1994 births
Living people
CB Canarias players
CB Miraflores players
Centers (basketball)
Liga ACB players
Ole Miss Rebels men's basketball players
Spanish expatriate basketball people in the United States
Spanish men's basketball players
Spanish people of Dominican Republic descent
Sportspeople of Dominican Republic descent
Basketball players from Madrid
Sun Rockers Shibuya players